Karaisalı is a village in Bozyazı district of Mersin Province, Turkey. It is at the north east of Bozyazı and has almost merged with Bozyazı. The population of the village was 1196. as of 2012.

References

Villages in Bozyazı District